Neuvilly is a commune in the Nord department in northern France.

Heraldry

French sartorial heritage 
The city was a pivotal center of mulquinerie.

People
Frank Lester is buried there.

See also
Communes of the Nord department

References

Communes of Nord (French department)